Louis Morel (30 October 1880 – 6 June 1971) was a Belgian Catholic priest, missionary, and Bishop of the Roman Catholic Archdiocese of Suiyuan between 1938 and 1951.

Biography
Louis Morel was born in Houthem les Comines (now Comines-Warneton), Wallonia, Belgium, on 30 October 1880. He joined the CICM Missionaries in 1899. He was ordained a priest on 16 July 1905. He came to Mongolia to preach in the same year. On 21 March 1938 the Holy See appointed him as Bishop of the Roman Catholic Archdiocese of Suiyuan to replace Louis van Dyck, who died last year. He was consecrated on 18 October.

He retired on 19 August 1951. He died on 6 June 1971, aged 90.

References

 
 

1880 births
1971 deaths
People from Comines-Warneton
20th-century Belgian Roman Catholic priests
20th-century Roman Catholic bishops in China
Belgian Roman Catholic bishops
Chinese Roman Catholic bishops